The events of persecution against the Serbian population occurred in Ottoman Kosovo in 1878, as a consequence of the Serbian–Ottoman War (1876–78). Incoming Albanian refugees to Kosovo who were expelled by the Serb army from the Sanjak of Niš were involved in revenge attacks and hostile to the local Serb population. Albanian troops also participated in attacks, at the behest of Sultan Abdul Hamid II.

Background 

During the Serbian–Ottoman War of 1876–78, between 30,000 and 70,000 Muslims, mostly Albanians, were expelled by the Serb army from the Sanjak of Niš and fled to the Kosovo Vilayet. Within the context of the Serbian–Ottoman War, the Sultan Abdul Hamid II unleashed his auxiliary troops consisting of Kosovar Albanians on the remaining Serbs before and after the Ottoman army's retreat in 1878. Tensions in the form of revenge attacks arose by incoming Albanian refugees on local Kosovo Serbs that contributed to the beginnings of the ongoing Serbian-Albanian conflict in coming decades.

On January 19, 1878, 40 Albanian deserters retreating from the Ottoman army broke into the house of elder Taško, a serf, in the Bujanovac region, tied up the males and raped his two daughters and two daughters-in-law. The Albanian deserters were dispersed, drunk, and were intercepted first at Lukarce, where 6 of them were beaten to death. They killed all of them.

Legacy 
Ottoman defeat to Serbia alongside new geopolitical circumstances post 1878 opposed by Albanian nationalists resulted in attitudes among them that eventually supported what today is known as "ethnic cleansing" that made part of the Kosovo Serb population to leave.

Prior to the Balkan wars (1912–13), Kosovo Serb community leader Janjićije Popović stated that the wars of 1876–1878 "tripled" the hatred of Turks and Albanians, especially that of the refugee population from the Sanjak of Niš toward Serbs by committing acts of violence against them.

References

Sources
 

 

Serbian–Turkish Wars (1876–1878)
Massacres in the Ottoman Empire
Serbian–Albanian conflict
Kosovo Serbs
Persecution of Serbs
Kosovo vilayet
1876 in the Ottoman Empire
1877 in the Ottoman Empire
1878 in the Ottoman Empire
Ottoman Serbia
1876 in Serbia
1877 in Serbia
1878 in Serbia
19th century in Serbia
Pogroms
Massacres of Serbs
Persecution of Christians in the Ottoman Empire